Sagittaria kurziana, common names springtape and strap-leaf sagittaria, is an aquatic plant species native to Florida and naturalized in the Mariana Islands. It grows along large springs, very often those with high sulfur content, and along the banks of watercourses downstream from such springs.

Sagittaria kurziana is a perennial herb up to 250 cm tall. It has long, narrow, flat leaves that float on the surface of the water, up to 250 cm long but rarely more than 15 mm wide. These form huge masses of ribbon-like leaves flowing back and forth with the current. Inflorescences also float on the surface, the white flowers very often submerged.

References

External links
Gardening Europe, Piantaggine d acqua Sagittaria kurziana Glück 

kurziana
Freshwater plants
Flora of Florida
Plants described in 1927